Mujibul Huq was a Bangladesh civil servant and recipient of the Independence Day Award of Bangladesh.

Early life
Huq was born in Banaripara, Barisal. He studied in Dhaka University and was involved in the Language Movement of 1952. He taught in University of Dhaka for a while.

Career
Huq joined the Pakistan civil service in 1954. After the Independence of Bangladesh in 1971, he served as the secretary in a number of ministries including the defense ministry. He was the chairman of the National Pay Commission. He retired in 1988 as the cabinet secretary and in 1993, he was awarded the Atishdipankar Gold Medal. In 2005, he was awarded the Independence Day Award. He was a member of the Nagorik Committee in 2006.

Death
Huq died on 12 January 2014.

References

2014 deaths
People from Barisal District
University of Dhaka alumni
Academic staff of the University of Dhaka